The 1991 World Women's Curling Championship (branded as 1991 Canada Safeway World Women's Curling Championship for sponsorship reasons) took place from March 23–31, 1991 at the Winnipeg Arena in Winnipeg, Manitoba, Canada.

Teams

Round-robin standings

Round-robin results

Draw 1

Draw 2

Draw 3

Draw 4

Draw 5

Draw 6

Draw 7

Draw 8

Draw 9

Tiebreaker

Playoffs

Final

References
 

World Women's Curling Championship
World Women's Curling Championship, 1991
Curling competitions in Winnipeg
March 1991 sports events in Canada
1991 in women's curling
1991 in Manitoba
Women's curling competitions in Canada
1990s in Winnipeg
International sports competitions hosted by Canada
1991 in Canadian women's sports